Claude Albert Fuller (January 20, 1876 – January 8, 1968) — was an American, a lawyer, farmer, member of Arkansas State House of Representatives from 1903–05, and of the U.S. House of Representatives for the 3rd District of Arkansas from 1929-39.

Biography
Fuller was born on January 20, 1876, in Prophetstown, Whiteside County, Illinois to Wilmont P. and Maria (Ocobock) Fuller. In 1885 he moved to Arkansas with his parents, who settled on a farm near Eureka Springs. He attended the public schools. He worked as a boot black and as a janitor at the school where he enrolled. He dropped out of high school, took a better job in Chicago for a while and saved his money. Desiring to be a lawyer, he finished high school in Eureka Springs in 1896 at the age of twenty; went back to Chicago to attend the Kent School of Law; and returned to Eureka Springs to study law at the office of C. G. White. He then took the bar examination in open court, and on February 5, 1898, he was admitted to the bar and became a practicing lawyer. He married May Obenshain on December 25, 1899, and they had three children, one of whom died in infancy.

Career
Becoming city clerk of Eureka Springs from 1898 to 1902, Fuller was then elected member of the State house of representatives from  1903 to 1905. He was mayor of Eureka Springs from 1906 to 1910 and from 1920 to 1928. He served as prosecuting attorney of the fourth Arkansas judicial district from 1910 to 1914, and as president of the Eureka Springs School Board from 1916 to 1928. He was a delegate to all Democratic State conventions from 1903 to 1943. He was also delegate to the Democratic National Conventions in 1908, 1912, and others from 1924 to 1960.

Elected as a Democrat to the Seventy-first and to the four succeeding Congresses from March 4, 1929 to January 3, 1939. An unsuccessful candidate for renomination in 1938, he continued to practice law in Eureka Springs and was president of the Bank of Eureka Springs from 1930 until his death.

Death
Fuller died in Eureka Springs, Arkansas, on January 8, 1968 (age 91 years, 353 days). Interment at Odd Fellows Cemetery, Eureka Springs, Arkansas.

References

External links

 

Claude Albert Fuller at the Arkansas Encyclopedia 

1876 births
1968 deaths
Mayors of places in Arkansas
Democratic Party members of the Arkansas House of Representatives
Democratic Party members of the United States House of Representatives from Arkansas
People from Carroll County, Arkansas
People from Eureka Springs, Arkansas
People from Prophetstown, Illinois